Kuujjuaq (or , "Great River"), formerly known as  and by other names, is a former Hudson's Bay Company outpost at the mouth of the Koksoak River on Ungava Bay that has become the largest northern village (Inuit community) in the Nunavik region of Quebec, Canada. It is the administrative capital of the Kativik Regional Government. Its population was 2,668 as of the 2021 census.

Names
Kuujjuaq was founded as Fort Good Hope in 1830 but in 1831 changed its name to Fort Chimo, an anglicization of an Inuit language word , meaning "Let's shake hands" and also likely to avoid confusion with Fort Good Hope operated by the Hudson's Bay Company (HBC) in the Northwest Territories. As this was a common greeting locals used with the HBC fur traders, they adopted it as the name of their trading post. A fictional account of this naming is given in the 1857 novel Ungava by R. M. Ballantyne, where it is taken from a girl character's beloved dog. On 5 February 1980, the name was changed to Kuujjuaq, the Inuit name for the Koksoak River.

It has also been known informally as Koksoak and Washgagen.

History

The first Europeans to have contact with local Inuit were missionaries from the Moravian Church. On August 25, 1811, after a perilous trip along the coasts of Labrador and Ungava Bay, Benjamin Gottlieb Kohlmeister and George Kmoch arrived at an Inuit camp on the east shore of the Koksoak. Their aim was to scout the area for future missions and, if possible, to convert the "Esquimaux" to Christianity. According to their journal, they found  the Inuit of the Koksoak River very interested in having a Moravian mission in the area, but after reaching a little farther than "Pilgerruh" ("Pilgrim's Rest") on "Unity's Bay" they turned back for home.

Governor Simpson's plan was to attract trade from the Inuit of the surrounding territory as well as from the islands and ice sheets north of the bay. Its first factor was Nicol Finlayson, who sent Erland Erlandson to establish an outpost on the Wausquash; this had to be abandoned in late 1833 or early 1834. By 1833, Fort Chimo comprised seven buildings in a defensive square, principally trading in caribou hides and white fox and marten pelts. Erlandson ultimately discovered bountiful trapping far to the south in the highlands around Lake Petitsikapau; he briefly succeeded Finlayson as acting factor but was replaced when a brig delivered John McLean to his new post in 1837. Over the next four years, he succeeded in establishing an efficient riverine connection with Fort Smith on Lake Melville, but the trade at Chimo itself was so sparse that the trails they found were simply used to supply Fort Naskaupi in the rich interior. In the winter of 1840–1841, fish and game were so scarce that the agents were forced to scatter into open camps around the countryside to survive as best they could. Fort Chimo and its District of Ungava were shuttered on September 1, 1843, an HBC ship carting away the remaining men and supplies.

The fort did not reopen until 1866, when it was thought necessary to curtail the trade going to the Moravians in the area and the steamboat Labrador made resupplying the distant outpost easier. At that time, Inuit, Innu (Montagnais), and Naskapi came to trade at the post. By the 1950s, Fort Chimo included two dormitories, two warehouses, oil and salt sheds, and carpentry, cooperage, and machinist workshops. A sloop, a steamer, and outposts at the mouths of the Whale and George Rivers helped carry out the salmon catch each August, which was salted on site for use, sale, and export. The fort was usually supplied by the steamer Eric, while a smaller refrigerated steamer picked up the salmon haul.

Amid the Second World War, the United States Army Air Forces (USAAF) surveyed the area from amphibious aircraft out of Gander on July 12, 1941 and established the Crystal 1 weather station on the western shore of the Koksoak on October 10, 1941. It was supplied by the United States Coast Guard. An airfield was established in the summer of 1942, although it was never used for the Crimson East's intended purpose of facilitating trans-Atlantic ferry flights. The US turned over the base to the Canadian government in 1944 and 1945, which established Naval Radio Station Chimo (call sign CFI) as part of the Canadian Supplementary Radio Activities (SUPRAD) system in 1948. Direction-finding facilities were finished and commenced operations in 1949. In 1950, it became part of the Atlantic high-frequency radio direction finding (HFDF) network after the Royal Canadian Navy and the United States Navy agreed to coordinate and standardize their detection operations. The high cost of maintaining and supplying the base, however, led to it being shuttered in late summer 1952 and its equipment and personnel moved to Frobisher Bay (now Iqaluit) on Baffin Island. The site was eventually adapted as the Kuujjuaq Airport, which now includes a Nav Canada air-traffic control facility that relays information on flights in northern Canada to Montreal.

With more Inuit settling in the area during this time to assist the base, a Catholic mission was established in 1948 and was followed by an infirmary, a school, and a weather station. The HBC outpost at Fort Chimo was closed for months of repairs in 1957 after a major fire, and the post was moved closer to the airfield in 1960. The remaining families who had still lived around the old site finally joined the larger community, establishing present-day Kuujjuaq (although it did not receive that name until 1980). The HBC store was sold to Hudson's Bay Northern Stores in 1987.

Since 1996, police services in the Kativik region, including Kuujjuaq, are provided by the Kativik Regional Police Force (KRPF). The headquarters of the KRPF are located in Kuujjuaq.

Geography
Life in this community involves a close relationship with the river. Its tides regularly change the local landscape, while their rhythm strongly influences the traditional summer activities.

Although the tree line is very close, the boreal forest is present around Kuujjuaq. Patches of black spruce and larch stand in marshy valleys. Kuujjuaq also witnesses annual migrations of the George River caribou herd. These animals pass through the region throughout August and September.

Climate
Kuujjuaq has a cold subarctic climate (Köppen Dfc), not far above the polar climate, but avoids that classification due to the temperate summers with daily mean temperatures of above . Winters are cold but by no means extreme for its latitude by Eastern Canadian standards.

The cause of the extreme swings is the effect of the Hudson Bay to its west freezing in November. This eliminates maritime moderation from westerlies that are prevalent in moderating summer temperatures. With Hudson Bay effectively becoming a landmass during the winter, Kuujjuaq ends up being subject to severely cold winds. With the Labrador Current to its south-east also being cold, winter moderation from the east is also eliminated. Although less snowfall is received compared to the more coastal Nain further south, the influence of the current contributes to a sizeable snow tally for a climate that cold. In June, Hudson Bay thaws, resulting in mild maritime air from the cold water moderating westerlies. In spite of this, Kuujjuaq being situated with a direct landmass link to its south for thousands of kilometres can contribute to warm southerlies reaching the settlement, bringing temperatures above . Unlike Inukjuak directly on the Hudson Bay shore, Kuujjuaq thus has a greater continental warmth impact on its summers, and consequently lies below the tree line.

During fall, Kuujjuaq's diurnal temperature variation is at its lowest, as the maritime moderation is at its strongest. Simultaneously, the Hudson Bay freezing process begins as cold builds up over the vast landmasses surrounding the bay. This renders Kuujjuaq to commonly get ice days during October, before winter begins in November and proceeds to the end of April. Kuujjuaq has a cloudy climate, as a result of the Icelandic Low influence.

Kuujjuaq has been affected by global warming in recent decades, similar to other Arctic locations. Summer has also been affected, with a  average high for June 2012, and a  average high during August 2014.

Demographics 

Transportation

With ocean access and two runways at the Kuujjuaq Airport, Kuujjuaq is the transportation hub of the entire Nunavik region. The Avataq cargo ship delivers cargo once a year, and a new beach port has been built north of the town. There are no roads to outside the region, but there have been proposals floated by regional and provincial officials to build a road link from the south, linking to the Trans-Taïga Road and also providing access to Schefferville.

Education
Kativik School Board (Kativik Ilisarniliriniq) operates two schools in the village. Pitakallak School serves students from kindergarten to grade 3, while Jaanimmarik School serves students from grade 4 to secondary 5.
The village boasts a number of hotels, restaurants, stores, arts and crafts shops and a bank. In 1988, 75% of the town's 1,100 residents were native speakers of Inuktitut, 15% native francophones, and 10% native anglophones.

Notable people
John McLean, HBC trader, explorer, and author
Sheila Watt-Cloutier, Canadian Inuit activist
Charlie Watt, Canadian senator and founding president of the Makivik Corporation
Johnny Ned Adams, former mayor and businessman
Mary Simon, 30th Governor General of Canada, First Canadian Circumpolar Ambassador, Canadian former diplomat, lead negotiator for the creation of the Arctic Council, and current fellow with the Arctic Institute of North America.

References

Sources

 .
 .
 .
 .

Further reading

 Bissonnette, Alain, and Serge Bouchard. The Kuujjuaq Population's Point of View on the Social and Economic Repercussions of the Caniapiscau Cut-Off on Their Hunting and Fishing Activities. [S.l.]: Société d'énergie de la baie James, Engineering and Environment Dept., Caniapiscau-Koksoak Joint Study Group, 1984.
 Canada. Kuujjuaq. Ottawa: Environment and Climate Change Canada, Atmospheric Environment Service, 1985. 
 Canada. Fort Chimo Airport. Hourly data summaries, no. 62. Toronto, Ont: Climatology Division, Meteorological Branch, Dept. of Transport, 1968.
 Chabot, Marcelle. Socio-economic status and food security of low-income households in Kuujjuaq research report. Kuujjuac, Quebec: Nunavik Regional Board of Health and Social Services?], 2004.
 Cooper, Willie. Souvenirs d'un Kuujjuamiut = Memories of a Kuujjuamiut. Publication of the Documentation Centre on Inuit History, 1. Inukjuak, Nunavik: Avataq Cultural Institute, 1988.
 Mesher, Dorothy, and Ray H. Woollam. Kuujjuaq Memories and Musings. Duncan, B.C.: Unica Pub. Co, 1995. 
 Poirier, Glenn Gerard. Structure and Metamorphism of the Eastern Boundary of the Labrador Trough Near Kuujjuaq, Quebec, and Its Tectonic Implications. Ottawa: National Library of Canada, 1990. 
 Boutin, Gilles. Les aurores boréales Québec-Nunavik. Quebec 2010.

External links

Jaanimmarik School
Kativik Regional Government
Nunavik Tourism Association
Time-lapse video of Kuujjuaq
Transportation plan by Quebec provincial government, including a study of the town's road link.

Inuit communities in Quebec
Hudson's Bay Company trading posts
Road-inaccessible communities of Quebec